Sadabad-e Arab (also Romanized as Sa‘dābād-e ʿArab; also known as Sa‘dābād) is a village in Eshqabad Rural District, Miyan Jolgeh District, Nishapur County, Razavi Khorasan Province, Iran. At the 2006 census, its population was 131, in 33 families.

References 

Populated places in Nishapur County